Andrew J. Falk (born April 1983) is a Minnesota politician and former member of the Minnesota House of Representatives. A member of the Minnesota Democratic–Farmer–Labor Party (DFL), he represented District 17A, which included all or portions of Chippewa, Kandiyohi, Renville, Swift counties in southwestern Minnesota. He is also a fifth generation farmer and renewable energy developer.

Early life, education, and career
Falk graduated from the Kerkhoven-Murdock-Sunburg Public School System, then went on to the University of Minnesota's Carlson School of Management in Minneapolis, earning his bachelor's degree in Entrepreneurial Management and Finance. He is a soybean and seed processing farmer, and is the co-founder of Knight Energy LLC, a wind-power company.

Minnesota House of Representatives
Falk was first elected in 2008, opting to run after Rep. Aaron Peterson decided not to seek re-election. He was re-elected in 2010 and 2012. He lost re-election in 2014 and sought election to his old seat again in 2016, losing both times to Republican Tim Miller.

References

External links 

1983 births
Living people
People from Swift County, Minnesota
Democratic Party members of the Minnesota House of Representatives
Carlson School of Management alumni
Farmers from Minnesota
21st-century American politicians